Bruneian Passports are issued to citizens of Brunei for the purpose of international travel. When Brunei was a British protectorate, British passports were used.

Validity
The Bruneian Passport is valid for a period of 5 years. To travel overseas, a passport must be valid for at least six months into the future.

Biometric passport
Since May 2008, all Brunei passports contain biometric features. The biometric passport contains a chip which stores facial and fingerprint image.

Brunei passport is coloured red. Brunei's coat of arms is in the middle of the front of the Brunei passport, with the name of the country above it and "passport" below it.

Identification page 

 Passport holder photo (Width: 40mm, Height: 52mm; Head height (up to the top of the hair): 35mm; Distance from the top of the photo to the top of the hair: 6mm)
 Type ("P" for passport)
 Code of the country
 Serial number of the passport
 Surname and first name of the passport holder
 Citizenship
 Date of birth (DD.MM.YYYY)
 Gender (M for men or F for women)
 Place of Birth
 Date of issue (DD.MM.YYYY)
 Passport holder's signature
 Expiry date (DD.MM.YYYY)

Languages
The data page/information page is printed in Malay and English.

Certificate of Identity
In lieu of a passport, Bruneian permanent residents who are otherwise stateless are afforded the right to obtain a Bruneian International Certificate of Identity.

Visa requirements

As of 28 September 2019, Bruneian citizens had visa-free or visa on arrival access to 165 countries and territories, ranking the Bruneian passport 21st in the world in terms of travel freedom according to the Henley Passport Index. Additionally, Arton Capital's Passport index ranked the Bruneian passport 15th in the world in terms of travel freedom, with a visa-free score of 151, as of October 2019.

As of October 2018, the passports of Brunei, Japan, Singapore and San Marino are the only ones to allow either visa-free entry or electronic travel authorisation to the world's four largest economies, namely China, India, the European Union and the United States. The Bruneian passport is also the only one in the world that allows visa-free access to China, Russia, the Schengen Area, United Kingdom and the United States, which are the five permanent members of the United Nations Security Council. Brunei is also the only Muslim-majority country in the world whose citizens are allowed to enter the United States without a pre-arranged travel visa.

See also
Visa requirements for Bruneian citizens

References

Brunei
Law of Brunei
Foreign relations of Brunei